Anil-Arun refers to the Indian music director duo of Anil Mohile, a music director and music arranger, and Arun Paudwal, a music director. The duo has worked well in Marathi movies.

Career

Although they mostly embarked on solo projects at different points of their respective careers, Anil-Arun teamed up again for many Marathi in total. Anuradha Paudwal, singer and wife of Arun Paudwal has sung most of the songs.

Below is a list of those movies:

 
 
 

Arun Paudwal's death in the year 1991 ended the pair's work. Anil Mohile continued to create music for Marathi movies.

Popular songs composed

References

Indian musical duos
Marathi film score composers